Marshfield Township may refer to the following townships in the United States:

 Marshfield Township, Lincoln County, Minnesota
 Marshfield Township, Webster County, Missouri, in Webster County, Missouri
 Marshfield (township), Wood County, Wisconsin